Mohamed Kaci-Saïd (born 2 May 1958) is an Algerian football midfielder who played for Algeria in the 1986 FIFA World Cup. He also played for RC Kouba.

Doping mystery
In November 2011 Kaci-Saïd, who has a disabled daughter, and other of his World Cup Finals teammates called for an investigation into whether their children's disabilities had in any way to do with medication ordered to them by Algeria's Soviet coach Evgeni Rogov.

Honours

With clubs
 Algerian League Champion in 1981 with RC Kouba

With the Algerian national team
 Participations in the 1986 FIFA World Cup in Mexico
 3rd in the African Cup of Nations of 1984 in the Ivory Coast and 1988 in Morocco

References

External links
FIFA profile

1958 births
Footballers from Algiers
Algerian footballers
Algeria international footballers
Association football midfielders
RC Kouba players
1986 FIFA World Cup players
Living people
1982 African Cup of Nations players
1984 African Cup of Nations players
1986 African Cup of Nations players
1988 African Cup of Nations players
21st-century Algerian people